A by-election for the seat of Gippsland South in the Victorian Legislative Assembly was held on 14 March 2015. The by-election was triggered by the resignation of former state National Party leader and Deputy Premier, Peter Ryan. Ryan had been a member of the Victorian parliament for over 22 years, and last retained the seat at the 2014 election on a 65.7 percent two-party vote, with a negative 6.9 percentage point swing. The election was contested on the same boundaries used at the previous state election.

The writ for the by-election was issued on 17 February, with the rolls closing at 8pm on Tuesday 24 February. A total of 40,649 people were registered to vote in the by-election. Candidate nominations closed on 27 February. The Labor Party did not nominate a candidate, and the election was contested by both a Liberal and National candidate, a rare occurrence given that the two parties are linked in the Coalition.

The two-party preferred count was initially completed between the Nationals and the Greens, who the VEC predicted to finish first and second respectively. However, Liberal candidate Scott Rossetti polled above Green Andrea Millsom and so a further distribution of preferences was required. The Nationals won the election on the preferences of minor parties and independents, without Green or Liberal preferences being allocated.

The seat was retained by the Nationals, with Danny O'Brien winning the seat after resigning from the Victorian Legislative Council to contest the by-election.

The Greens campaigned strongly on an anti-coal seam gas platform, and encouraged voters from other parties to write "no CSG" on ballot papers to register their displeasure with the practice.

Candidates
The eight nominated candidates in ballot paper order are:

Results

|- style="background-color:#E9E9E9"
! colspan="6" style="text-align:left;" |After distribution of preferences

References

External links
Gippsland South District by-election – Victorian Electoral Commission
2015 Gippsland South By-election – ABC Elections

2015 elections in Australia
Victorian state by-elections
2010s in Victoria (Australia)